= Maria Velluti =

Portuguese-born Brazilian stage actor and singer

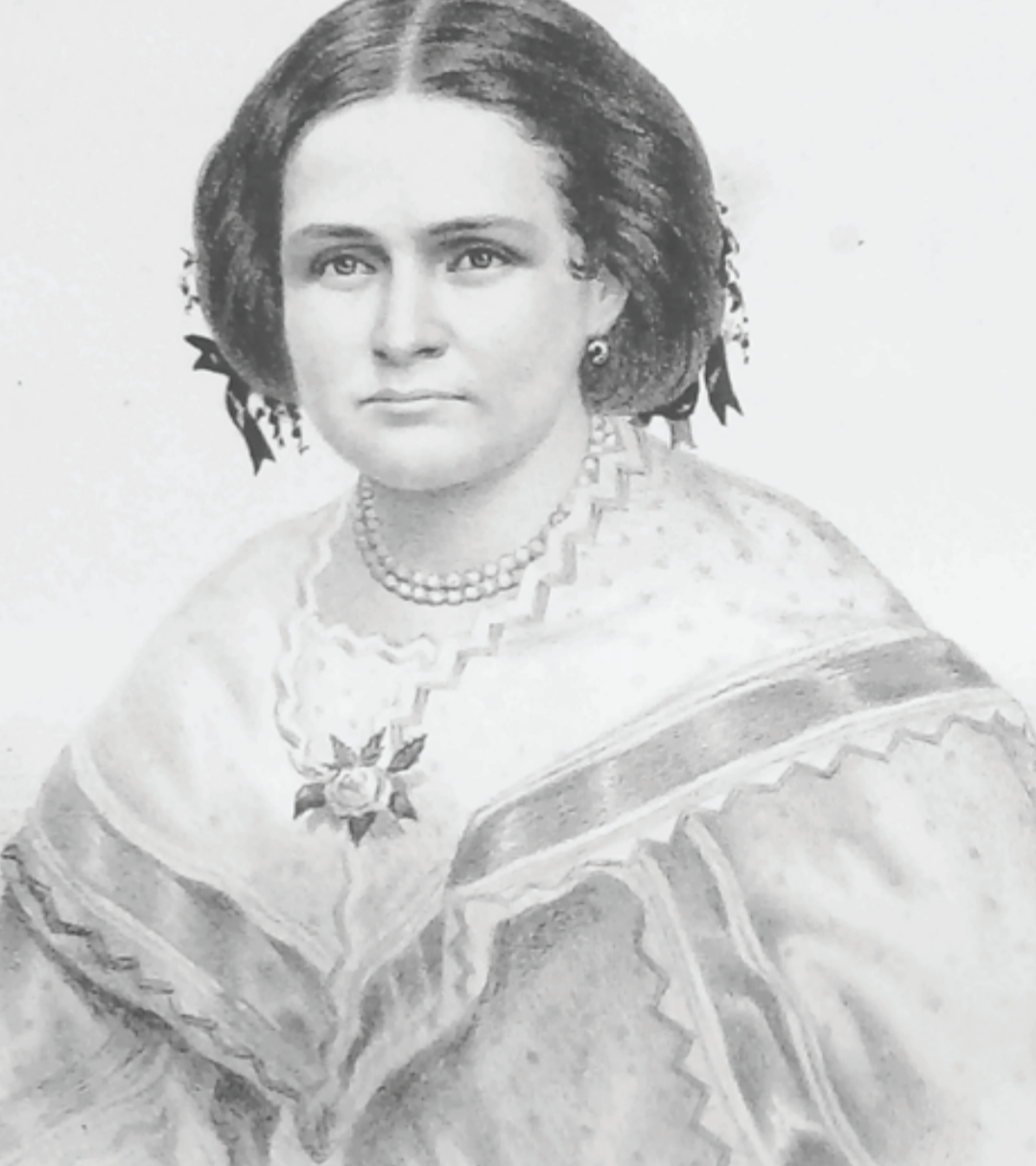

Maria Velluti (1827–1891) was a Portuguese-born Brazilian actress and singer.

She made her stage debut on the royal theatre in Lisbon in 1845. In 1847, she emigrated to Brazil, where she was engaged as a singer and actress. She played an important role in the mid 19th-century theatre life of Brazil, both as a stage artist as well as a translator of plays, representing the strong Portuguese influence prevalent in Brazilian theatre at the time. She married the theatre manager and actor Joaquim Augusto Ribeiro de Sousa.
